Ove Karlsson (born 9 July 1950 in Gusum, Sweden)SIHA 2007, cited. is a retired ice hockey player from Sweden.

Biography
From 1974 to 1984, he played as forward with Västra Frölunda HC in the Elitserien (Swedish Elite League).  He played 316 for the team, scoring 121 goals and 93 assists for 214 points.  He began his career playing in the Swedish Second Division for Grums IK.

See also

 List of Frölunda HC players

References

 Tertiary sources consulted 

 

 Endnotes

External links

1950 births
Frölunda HC players
Living people
Swedish ice hockey forwards